= Tom Bunn (airline captain) =

American airline captain and author

Tom Bunn is an American retired airline captain, author and former USAF fighter pilot, who founded SOAR Inc.

== Early life and Professional career ==
During his youth, Bunn worked as a freelance photographer for local newspapers, including The Gold Leaf Farmer, The Zebulon Record, The Raleigh Times, and The News and Observer. He also worked as a summer staff photographer for The Raleigh Times, covering for regular staff members during vacations. Bunn attended Wake Forest College, where he double-majored in Psychology and English.

In 1982, Bunn founded SOAR Inc. to address the fear of flying. Initially integrating cognitive-behavioral therapy (CBT) with aviation safety education, Bunn discovered that the key to overcoming flight anxiety was changing individuals’ responses to the lack of control and inability to escape, which are common triggers for panic.

Bunn authored two books: SOAR: The Breakthrough Treatment for Fear of Flying and Panic Free: The 10-Day Program to End Panic, Anxiety, and Claustrophobia. He contributed to Clinical Applications of the Polyvagal Theory: The Emergence of Polyvagal-Informed Therapies, edited by Stephen Porges and Deborah Dana.

== Publications ==
- Airline Captain: Don't Lose Faith in Pilots
- Psychology Today – Conquer Fear of Flying
- New York Journal of Books – Tom Bunn
